The Perth Scorchers are an Australian cricket club who play in the Big Bash League, the national domestic Twenty20 competition. The club was established in 2011 as an inaugural member of the eight-club league. The Big Bash League consists of a regular season and a finals series of the top four teams. The two "Big finalists" earn the right to compete in the international Twenty20 tournament called the Champions League Twenty20 (CLT20). This list includes players who have played at least one match for the Scorchers in the Big Bash League and the Champions League Twenty20.

Records

List of Players

 

Source: ESPN.cricinfo Scorchers Batting records and ESPN.cricinfo Scorcher Bowling & Fielding records

See also
 List of Perth Scorchers (WBBL) cricketers

References 

Perth Scorchers cricketers

Big Bash League lists
Perth, Western Australia-related lists